S.W.O.R.D. (an acronym for Secret World Organization for Retribution & Destruction) is a fictional criminal organization that exists as a creation within a creation. The organization appears in the novel The Saint and the Fiction Makers, written by Fleming Lee. It is credited to editor Leslie Charteris who created the title character of Simon Templar, alias "The Saint". The Fiction Makers was adapted from a two-part episode of the same title written by John Kruse from The Saint TV series. This was later recut and released in 1968 as a black-and-white movie.

As depicted in The Fiction Makers, S.W.O.R.D. is a diabolical criminal organization that pulls off ingenious heists. It is a creation of author "Amos Klein", the pen name of Joyce Darling, a character in the book. The plot deals with Simon Templar (alias the Saint) fighting to stop S.W.O.R.D. from becoming a real organization.

Templar is hired to bodyguard the reclusive Amos Klein on behalf of Klein's publisher Finlay Hugoson (Peter Ashmore) only to discover "he" is really a clever, if eccentric, woman named Joyce Darling (Sylvia Syms). When they are kidnapped by S.W.O.R.D., they assume Templar is Amos Klein and that Miss Darling is his secretary. Now they must help S.W.O.R.D. plan a heist on one of the most secure vaults in the world or die horribly at their hands.

Characters 
Klein develops the following characters within S.W.O.R.D.:
Warlock: The megalomaniacal genius who runs S.W.O.R.D.
The Bishop: A master of disguise. He is usually discovered due to the unique and ornate turquoise ring he wears at all times.
Frug: A giant of a man; all brawn and very little brain.
Nero Jones: Rip Savage's nemesis. He is a foil to Savage, a dark reflection of his personality.
Simeon Monk: The Bishop's henchman.
Galaxy Rose: The femme fatale, a voluptuous blonde with a sultry voice. She is Warlock's mistress because of the control he has over her father, but occasionally acts against him on a whim. She is seen to have an affection for Rip Savage, the hero of the Klein novels, but is notably fickle. She often flirts with Rip just to make Warlock jealous or angry.

Rip Savage Novels
Rip Savage, the protagonist of "Amos Klein's" books, is a parody of James Bond.
Sunburst Five: The fifth novel in the series.
Volcano Seven: In the prologue of Episode 11 (The Fiction Makers, Part One), Simon Templar (played by Roger Moore), is at the premiere for Volcano Seven, a movie based on the seventh Rip Savage novel. Templar mocks how formulaic, predictable and unrealistic the character and plot are. Coincidentally, Moore would later play James Bond.
The Hatelover: The Rip Savage novel that Klein is working on. She is toying with the idea of killing off the character by electrocuting him.

References
Roy Ward Baker (Director), John Kruse (Story & Screenwriter). The Saint, Season 6, Episodes 11 and 12 (first aired December 8 & 15, 1968). ITV. 
Robert S. Baker (Producer), Roy Ward Baker (Director), John Kruse (Story & Screenwriter). The Fiction Makers (first released December 24, 1970). ITV. - The feature film, edited together from the two episodes.   
The Saint and the Fiction Makers by Fleming Lee. Crime Club (an imprint of Doubleday) (first edition: January 1, 1968). The novelization of the episodes.

The Saint (Simon Templar)
Fictional organized crime groups
Fictional intelligence agencies